Humber is a hamlet and civil parish in the county of Herefordshire, England, and is  north from the city and county town of Hereford. The closest large town is Leominster  to the north-west.

History
The name Humber derives from the pre-English name for a river. Within Humber were two manors, listed in the Domesday Book, Humber and Risbury. At the time of the Norman Conquest both were in the Hundred of Leominster in the county of Herefordshire. Humber is listed as "Humbre", with assets of 11 villagers, 22 smallholders (middle level of serf below a villager), 16 slaves and two priests. Working the ploughlands were three lord's and ten men's plough teams. The manor contained one league of woodland and two mills. The lords of the various local manors, including Humber, were Leofwin (the interpreter), Ralph of Mortimer, Roger de Lacy, Urse d'Abetot, and William son of Norman. In 1086 the lordship of Humber was passed to Queen Edith under the tenant-in-chief and king William I. Risbury is listed with eight households, one villager, three smallholders, four slaves, two lord's plough teams, and one mill. In 1066 Edwin held the lordship, which passed in 1086 to Robert, with  William d'Ecouis as tenant-in-chief under Queen Edith as overlord for William I.

Geography
Adjacent parishes are Docklow and Hampton Wafer at the north, Grendon Bishop at the north-east, Pencombe with Grendon Warren at both the east and south-east, Bodenham at the south, and Ford and Stoke Prior at the west. The parish is rural, of farms, fields, managed woodland and coppices, streams, isolated and dispersed businesses, and residential properties, the nucleated settlements being the hamlets of Humber at the extreme west of the parish, and Risbury approximately at the centre. Even smaller parish settlements are Steen's Bridge at the extreme north-west, and Great Marston at the east with the adjacent Marston Stannet farther east. All other routes are minor roads, country lanes, bridleways, farm tracks and footpaths. The hamlet of Humber consists of a farm and the parish church of St Mary the Virgin.

Governance
Humber is represented in the lowest tier of UK governance by five members on the eleven-member Humber, Ford and Stoke Prior Parish Council. As Herefordshire is a unitary authority—no district council between parish and county councils—the parish sends one councillor, representing the Hampton Ward, to Herefordshire County Council. Humber is represent in the UK parliament as part of the North Herefordshire constituency, held by the Conservative Party since 2010 by Bill Wiggin.

In 1974 Humber became part of the Malvern Hills District of the county of Hereford and Worcester county, instituted under the 1972 Local Government Act.  Until Brexit, on 31 January 2020 the parish was represented in the European Parliament as part of the West Midlands constituency.

Landmarks
Within the parish are two Grade II* and twelve Grade II listed buildings and structures, and three scheduled monuments, including the Church of St Mary, dating to 1200, the 17th-century Humber Court, and the 18th-century Risbury Mill.

References

External links

Civil parishes in Herefordshire
Hamlets in Herefordshire